"Aati Kya Khandala" is a Hindi song sung by Indian actor Aamir Khan and playback singer Alka Yagnik and composed by Jatin–Lalit. It was a part of the soundtrack of the 1998 Hindi film Ghulam. The lyrics were written by Nitin Raikwar.

About the song

"Aati Kya Khandala" is part of the movie Ghulam. In the movie, Alisha (Rani Mukerji) is upset after a fight with her father. Her friend and lover Sidhu (Aamir Khan) tries to cheer her up by singing the song "Aati Kya Khandala". Literally, the song is a request to come to Khandala, a scenic holiday location near Mumbai, the city where the film is not situated.

Aamir Khan is the playback singer for himself and Alka Yagnik is the playback singer for Rani Mukherji.

Reception and impact

The song became an instant hit and is one of Bollywood's most popular songs ever, to the extent that Rani Mukherjee became known as Khandala Girl.

The song was also the first in a spate of songs sung by actors in Bollywood movies, and was the inspiration for many of these, including "Apun Bola" sung by Shahrukh Khan for Josh, also written by Nitin Raikwar. In more recent times, it was rumored that Dhoom 3 would feature a song sung by Aamir Khan in the vein of "Aati Kya Khandala".

The song "Aati Kya Khandala" has also been blamed for eve-teasing (a term used in India for minor forms of sexual harassment, usually verbal, carried out in public) as eve-teasers have been reported to sing the song as part of eve-teasing.

In popular culture
The song was used in the 2001 film Kabhi Khushi Kabhi Gham.

References

External links
Music Video

Indian songs
Hindi film songs
Lonavala-Khandala
Songs with music by Jatin–Lalit
Aamir Khan